John Paul Orchison, known professionally as Blanke, is an Australian electronic music producer and DJ from Canberra, Australia.

Career
Blanke's first release was a remix of Death Ray Shake on Ministry Of Sound's Downright Music label in 2015. After that in 2016 he released his first EP "Black Mamba/Koji" under Artist Intelligence Agency. After a year Blanke made his debut under the KLASH label with his first single "Immunity". In 2017 John introduced his second EP "Curiosity" and released few remixes. 2018 has been a very productive year for him. He released collaborations and remixes on Buygore, Dim Mak Records, Kannibalen Records, Etcetc Music, WeDidIt, Ultra Records, Joytime Collective, Circus Media. The following year he released "Mixed Signals" as a result of collaboration with electronic music producer Rezz. In 2019 his collaboration with Illenium "Gorgeous" was featured on Illenium's new album Ascend. Blanke accompanied Nick on his tour across the North America as main support for his new album. Later that year he had his first Deadbeats release "Alt.Colour//Voice In The Machine EP" and then "Change & Decay EP". In 2020 he released his follow up EP titled "Change & Decay: The Fall" on Deadbeats Records, which featured Alchemy, a record that went onto to peak at #1 most played on Australia's triple j. in 2021, Blanke made his debut on Seven Lion's Ophelia Records, release collaborations with Jason Ross, Seven Lions as well as 3 Solo singles. He performed at Lost Lands, EDC Las Vegas and many more festival throughout the North American Summer.

Discography

Extended plays

Singles

Remixes

Flips

Awards and nominations

J Awards
The J Awards are an annual series of Australian music awards that were established by the Australian Broadcasting Corporation's youth-focused radio station Triple J. They commenced in 2005.

! 
|-
| J Awards of 2021
| Blanke
| Unearthed Artist of the Year
| 
|

References

Australian electronic musicians
Living people
Australian DJs
1991 births